William J. Laurino (born April 27, 1941) was an American politician.

Born in Chicago, Illinois, Laurino served in the United States Army. He went to Wilbur Wright College and Loyola University Chicago. Laurino served in the Illinois Sixth Constitutional Convention of 1970 and was a Democrat. Laurino served in the Illinois House of Representatives from 1971 to 1997.

Notes

1941 births
Living people
Politicians from Chicago
Loyola University Chicago alumni
Democratic Party members of the Illinois House of Representatives
Military personnel from Illinois